Kemal Satır (21 April 1911 – 23 May 1991) was a Turkish physician and politician.

Early years
He was born in Adana. After finishing the School of Medicine in Istanbul University, he began working as a radiology expert in 1937. He also became a member of Republican People's Party (CHP). Between 1943 and 1950, he was the MP from Adana Province, and between 1949-1950, he served as the Minister of Transportation in the 18th government of Turkey (Şemsettin Günaltay's cabinet).

After 1950
After the defeat of CHP in 1950 elections, in which he lost his seat in the parliament, he returned to medical practice. In 1957, he was elected as the MP from Elazığ Province, and continued as Elazığ MP up to 1969, when he changed his electoral province to Adana again. Between 1963-1965, he became the deputy prime minister in the cabinet of İsmet İnönü.

Strife in the party
Kemal Satır also served in the party administration. From 1962 to 1966, he became the secretary general of CHP. He was known as a moderate politician, and tried to keep the balance during the intra party struggle between Bülent Ecevit and Turhan Feyzioğlu. However, after Turhan Feyzioğlu and his group left the party, he became the main opponent of Bülent Ecevit. After Bülent Ecevit became the chairman of the party, Kemal Satır and a group of MPs left the party.

Republican Party
He formed a party named Republican Party. The party was founded on 4 September 1972. He was elected as the chairman of the party. The new established party lived short. On 28 February 1973, it merged to Nationalist Reliance Party (aka Reliance Party) of Turhan Feyzioğlu. After merging, the party was renamed Republican Reliance Party. Kemal Satır became the vice president. During this period, he served as the deputy prime minister in Naim Talu's cabinet once more.

Last years 
After the election defeat in 1973, he resigned from the politics. He took part in the board of directors of two banks. He died in 1991.

See also
18th government of Turkey
28th government of Turkey
36th government of Turkey

References 

1911 births
1991 deaths
People from Adana
People from Adana vilayet
Republican People's Party (Turkey) politicians
Republican Reliance Party politicians
20th-century Turkish politicians
Deputy Prime Ministers of Turkey
Ministers of Transport and Communications of Turkey
Deputies of Adana
Deputies of Elazığ
Leaders of political parties in Turkey
Turkish radiologists
Istanbul University Faculty of Medicine alumni
Members of the 28th government of Turkey
Members of the 36th government of Turkey
Members of the 18th government of Turkey
Ministers of State of Turkey
20th-century Turkish physicians